Kireh may refer to:
Older name of: 
Qira, Salfit